Andree or Andrée is a surname. Notable people with the name include:

 Denice Andrée, Swedish model and beauty queen
 Elfrida Andrée (1841– 11 January 1929), was a Swedish organist, composer, and conductor
 Harry Andree (1913–1944), Nazi German Oberstleutnant during World War II
 Karl Andree (1808–1875), German geographer
 George Andree (1879–1934), American college football coach
 Ingrid Andree (born 1931), German actress
 John Andree (disambiguation), multiple people, including:
John Andree (physician) (c. 1699–1785), British physician, father of the surgeon
John Andree (surgeon) ( 1790), English surgeon, son of the physician
 Leif Andrée (born 1958), Swedish actor
 Paul J. Andree (1924–2014), American college football coach
 Richard Andree (1835–1912), German geographer and cartographer
 Richard V. Andree (1919–1987), American mathematician and computer scientist
 Salomon August Andrée (1854–1897), Swedish engineer, physicist, aeronaut and polar explorer

See also
 Andrée (given name)
 Andrée (disambiguation)
 Andre (surname)